John Thomas Wolford (born October 16, 1995) is an American football quarterback who is a free agent. He played college football at Wake Forest and signed with the New York Jets as an undrafted free agent in 2018. He has also played for the Arizona Hotshots of the Alliance of American Football.

Early years 
Wolford was born in Dallas, Texas, and moved to Jacksonville at an early age where he attended Bishop Kenny High School. As a pro-style quarterback, he was rated a three-star recruit by Rivals.com and ESPN and committed to play college football at Wake Forest. He was briefly the all-time leader in all major statistical passing categories for high school football in the state of Florida.

College career 
Wolford started his college career as the first Wake Forest player to start all 12 games as a true freshman, setting school records in attempts, passing yards, touchdowns, and completion percentage by a true freshman. He struggled at times, throwing 13 interceptions in his first eight games, but showed improvement over the year, throwing only one interception in the final four. He finished eighth in the ACC in passing yards per game at 169.8, ranking second among freshmen in the conference behind only Miami's Brad Kaaya.

He had another strong year as a sophomore. In the first game of the season, he threw for a career-high 323 yards in a 41–3 win over Elon; the next week, he threw for 373 yards in a 30–17 loss vs. Syracuse. His 696 passing yards in the first two games constituted the best start ever by a Wake Forest quarterback. As a junior, he started 11 of 13 games, missing one game due to injury.

As a senior, he had the most impressive season of his college career, earning second-team all-ACC honors and setting school records in single-season passer rating, passing yards, touchdown passes, total offense yards, and touchdowns, as well as the school record in career touchdowns. In the Belk Bowl, he set school bowl game records in completions (32), attempts (49), passing yards (400), and touchdowns (4), becoming the first FBS player since 2000 to pass for 400+ yards, rush for 65+ yards, and throw no interceptions in a bowl game.

Professional career

New York Jets
After going undrafted in the 2018 NFL Draft, Wolford signed as an undrafted free agent with the New York Jets. He played in most of the preseason finale against the Philadelphia Eagles, completing 8 passes on 20 attempts for 89 yards and an interception. He was cut from the Jets on September 4.

Arizona Hotshots
The Arizona Hotshots drafted Wolford with their second-round pick in the 2019 AAF QB Draft. He entered the preseason competing with first-round pick Trevor Knight for the starting job; in the Hotshots' sole preseason game against the Birmingham Iron, Wolford completed 9 of 14 passes for 116 yards, a touchdown, and a two-point conversion. He was named starter prior to the regular season.

In the first game of the regular season, a 38–22 win over the Salt Lake Stallions, Wolford completed 18 of 29 passes for 275 yards, four touchdowns, and two two-point conversions; for his performance, he was named Week 1 AAF Offensive Player of the Week. He earned a second Player of the Week award in Week 7, when he completed 15 of 19 passes for 212 yards, two touchdowns, one interception, and a 126.3 passer rating and ran for a 35-yard touchdown in a 32–15 victory against the San Diego Fleet. Statistically, he was the 2nd best quarterback in the AAF's lone season.

Los Angeles Rams
On April 10, 2019, Wolford signed with the Los Angeles Rams of the NFL after the AAF suspended operations. He was waived during final roster cuts on August 31, 2019, but was signed the next day to the Rams' practice squad. He signed a reserve/future contract with the Rams on December 31, 2019.

Following an injury to starter Jared Goff during a Week 16 game against the Seattle Seahawks, Rams coach Sean McVay confirmed on December 28, 2020, that Wolford would start the final game of the season against the Arizona Cardinals. Wolford would become the first quarterback to make his first start with a team during Week 17 with a playoff berth on the line since Kyle Orton with the Dallas Cowboys in 2013. After throwing an interception to Cardinals linebacker Jordan Hicks on his first pass attempt of the game, Wolford quickly turned things around, completing 22 of 38 passes for 231 yards while also rushing six times for 56 yards as the Rams went on to beat the Cardinals 18–7 to clinch a playoff berth. He became the first quarterback to pass for 200+ yards and rush for 50+ yards in an NFL debut. Wolford started for the Rams in the wild card playoff game at the Seattle Seahawks, but left in the first quarter with a neck injury after sustaining a helmet to helmet hit from Seahawks safety Jamal Adams. He was taken to the hospital and later was released from the hospital the same day. Wolford completed three of six passes for 29 yards prior to leaving the game, which the Rams went on to win 30–20.

In 2021, Wolford served as the backup for the newly acquired quarterback Matthew Stafford. Wolford also remained the backup during the Rams' playoff run, winning Super Bowl LVI when they defeated the Cincinnati Bengals.

Career statistics

AAF career statistics

NFL career statistics

Regular season

Postseason

Career awards and records
 First quarterback in NFL history to pass for 200+ yards and rush for 50+ yards in an NFL debut.

Personal life
Wolford's uncle, Will Wolford, was a three-time Pro Bowl offensive tackle who played 13 seasons in the NFL.

References

External links
 Los Angeles Rams bio
 Wake Forest bio
 

1995 births
Living people
American football quarterbacks
Arizona Hotshots players
Los Angeles Rams players
New York Jets players
Players of American football from Jacksonville, Florida
Wake Forest Demon Deacons football players
Players of American football from Dallas